The Swedish national selection for the Eurovision Song Contest was Melodifestivalen 1974. It was, by a runaway score, won by the group ABBA, comprising Anni-Frid Lyngstad, Agnetha Fältskog, Benny Andersson and Björn Ulvaeus. Their song, "Waterloo", was written by Björn and Benny with Stig Anderson. It was originally written in Swedish, but for the ESC final, it was translated into English, which the rules allowed between the years 1973 and 1976.

ABBA was one of the favourites to win the 1974 contest, held in Brighton, United Kingdom. They sang in slot No. 8. In the voting, they received high points from the first jury to vote (Finland), but it was a close race until the third last jury, Switzerland, gave Sweden enough points to secure victory. Sweden received a total of 24 points, compared to runner-up Italy's 18. This was Sweden's first victory. In 2005, in the 50th anniversary show Congratulations, Waterloo was chosen the best Eurovision song ever.

Before Eurovision

Melodifestivalen 1974 

Melodifestivalen 1974 (on-screen title Melodifestival 1974) was the selection for the 15th song to represent Sweden at the Eurovision Song Contest. It was the 14th time that this system of picking a song had been used. Ten songwriters were selected by SR for the competition. The final was held in the SVT Studios in Stockholm on 9 February 1974, presented by Johan Sandström and was broadcast on TV1 but was not broadcast on radio. ABBA went on to win that year's Eurovision Song Contest in Brighton, Sweden's first Eurovision victory.

Voting

At Eurovision

Voting 
Every country had a jury of ten people. Every jury member could give one point to his or her favourite song.

Congratulations: 50 Years of the Eurovision Song Contest

"Waterloo" was one of fourteen Eurovision songs chosen by fans to compete in the Congratulations 50th anniversary special in 2005. The contest was broadcast on SVT with commentary by Pekka Heino. It was the only Swedish entry featured in the show, although several Swedish entrants were featured (including Swedish winners Carola and Richard Herrey of Herreys). "Waterloo" appeared seventh in the running order, following "Nel blu dipinto di blu" by Domenico Modugno and preceding "Fly on the Wings of Love" by the Olsen Brothers. At the end of the first round, it was announced that "Waterloo" had advanced to the second round along with four other songs. It was later revealed that "Waterloo" won the first round with 331 points. This included 18 sets of the maximum twelve points, including from Sweden (who, unlike in usual contests, were allowed to vote for their own entry). Coincidentally, the first proper competing Eurovision song to receive a record 18 top marks was a Swedish entry: "Euphoria" by Loreen, the winning song of the 2012 contest.

"Waterloo" went on to win the second round and the anniversary contest as a whole, scoring 329 points.

Voting

References

External links
TV broadcastings at SVT's open archive

1974
Countries in the Eurovision Song Contest 1974
1974
Eurovision
Eurovision